Germana Viana (born October 16, 1972) is a Brazilian comic book artist and writer.

Born in Recife, in 1972, Germana graduated in Arts from the São Paulo State University and began her career in the 1990s illustrating children's books. Since the early 2000s, she started acting as a graphic designer and comics letterer, having been assistant to Joe Prado in agencing  Brazilian artists for the North American market.

From 2013 she started publishing her own comic books, starting with the Lizzie Bordello e as Piratas do Espaço (Lizzie Bordello and the Space Pirates) series, which was released in two volumes, respectively in 2014 and 2016, by the Jambô publishing house.

As of March 8, 2016, she started publishing the webcomic As Empoderadas, which won the 29th HQ Mix Trophy in the "best web comic" category. She is married to writer and editor Rogério Saladino.

References

Brazilian translators
Brazilian comics writers
Brazilian comics artists
1972 births
Living people
People from Recife
São Paulo State University alumni
Brazilian female comics artists
Prêmio Angelo Agostini winners
Brazilian erotic artists